"Bitch's Brew" is a song from hard rock band Aerosmith's seventh studio album, Rock in a Hard Place.  It was the third track and the second single taken from the album. The single was released as a 12-inch vinyl for promotional purposes. It was the band's last single to be released by Columbia Records until 1997's Nine Lives.

Track listing
12" vinyl (promo):
"Bitch's Brew" - 4:14

Personnel
Steven Tyler - lead vocals, harmonica
Tom Hamilton - bass
Joey Kramer - drums
Jimmy Crespo - lead guitar, rhythm guitar additional vocals on "Bitches Brew"

Other personnel
Jack Douglas - producer
Steven Tyler - producer
Tony Bongiovi - producer

References

Aerosmith songs
1982 singles
Song recordings produced by Jack Douglas (record producer)
Songs written by Steven Tyler
Columbia Records singles
Songs written by Jimmy Crespo
1982 songs